Mazzino Montinari (4 April 1928 – 24 November 1986) was an Italian scholar of Germanistics. A native of Lucca, he became regarded as one of the most distinguished researchers on Friedrich Nietzsche, and harshly criticized the edition of The Will to Power, which he regarded as a forgery, in his book The will to power does not exist.

After the end of fascism in Italy, Montinari became an active member of the Italian Communist Party, with which he was occupied with the translation of German writings. During 1953, when he visited East Germany for research, he witnessed the Uprising of 1953. Later, after the suppression of the 1956 Hungarian Revolution, he drifted away from orthodox Marxism and his career in party organizations. He did however keep his membership in the Italian Communist Party and stayed true to the aims of socialism.

At the end of the 1950s, with Giorgio Colli, who was his teacher in the 1940s, Montinari began to prepare an Italian translation of Nietzsche's works. After reviewing the contemporary collection of Nietzsche's works and the manuscripts in Weimar, Colli and Montinari decided to begin a new, critical edition. This edition became the scholarly standard, and was published in Italian by Adelphi in Milan, in French by Éditions Gallimard in Paris, in German by Walter de Gruyter and in Dutch by Sun (translated by Michel van Nieuwstadt). Of particular help for this project was Montinari's ability to decipher Nietzsche's nearly unreadable handwriting, which before had only been transcribed by Peter Gast (born Heinrich Köselitz).

In 1972, Montinari and others founded the international journal Nietzsche-Studien, to which Montinari would remain a significant contributor until his death. Through his translations and commentary on Nietzsche, Montinari demonstrated a method of interpretation based on philological research that would forgo hasty speculations. He saw value in placing Nietzsche in the context of his time, and to this end, Colli and he began a critical collection of Nietzsche's correspondence.

Montinari died in Florence in 1986.

Works 
 Reading Nietzsche, trans. Greg Whitlock, University of Illinois Press, 2003, 
 "'The Will to Power' does not exist" edited by Paolo D'Iorio  (a book criticizing The Will to Power as a forgery, ill-assembled by Elisabeth Förster-Nietzsche)
 The Stanford University Press is in the midst of publishing 'the first complete, critical, and annotated English translation' of Nietzsche's works, which will be based on the Colli-Montinari edition.

External links 
 Biography of Mazzino Montinari (Adelphi.it) 

1928 births
1986 deaths
Writers from Lucca
Italian philologists
Italian Communist Party politicians
20th-century Italian politicians
20th-century Italian translators
Nietzsche scholars
Translators of Friedrich Nietzsche
20th-century philologists